Shirley Frances Knight (12 March 1936 5 February 2009) was a Canadian stage, television and radio actress.

Biography
Shirley spent her younger days in wartime England and emigrating with her parents to St. Catharines in 1947. There she appeared in children's plays in the "Library Story Hour" on CKTB radio station and took an active part in different drama groups. After some time Shirley began to work with professional repertory companies, including the Manitoba Theatre Center from 1956 to 1960.

Her career on television started in 1955. In mid-1970s she became director of publicity at Canada's MacMillan. After many years as an editor, she taught acting in Cambridge, England.

Death
Shirley Knight died on 5 February, 2009.

Filmography

Actress (Films)

Actress (Television works)

Host

Award
Shirley received the gold medal with honours and diploma for acting from the London Academy of Music and Dramatic Art (LAMDA) in 1990.

References

External links

1936 births
2009 deaths
Knight
20th-century Canadian actresses
Knight